Miodrag Baletić (15 October 1948 – 12 March 2021) was a Montenegrin professional basketball coach.

References

External links
 Eurobasket Women (2011) | FIBA Europe

1948 births
2021 deaths
KK Budućnost coaches
KK Bosna Royal coaches
KK Borac Banja Luka coaches
KK Lions/Swisslion Vršac coaches
KK Lovćen coaches
KK Sutjeska coaches
Montenegrin expatriate basketball people in Kosovo
Montenegrin expatriate basketball people in Serbia
Montenegrin expatriate basketball people in the United States
Montenegrin basketball coaches
KK FMP (1991–2011) coaches
KK Vojvodina Srbijagas coaches